The Bacon-Stickney House is a historic house located at 441 Loudon Road in Colonie, Albany County, New York.

Description and history 
Built in 1874 and designed by William M. Woollett, it is a two-story, "L" shaped residence. It has a gable roof with diamond shaped windows in the gable ends. It features a jerkin head-type roof over the wing. It is a significant example of late 19th century "pattern book" architecture in the Picturesque Cottage style. Also on the property is a contributing garage and well house.

It was listed on the National Register of Historic Places on October 3, 1985.

References

Houses on the National Register of Historic Places in New York (state)
Houses completed in 1874
Houses in Albany County, New York
National Register of Historic Places in Albany County, New York